The 1983–84 Wimpey Homes National Basketball League season was the twelfth season of the National Basketball League formed in the United Kingdom in 1972.

The league was sponsored by Wimpey Homes and Solent Stars achieved a clean sweep of National League, Play Offs and National Cup. Teams played each other three times in the league during the season. The Channel 4 exposure had assisted in teams finding sponsors but a decision by the Independent Broadcasting Authority to ban shirt advertising suddenly jeopardised these sponsorships.

Team changes
There had been no plans by the English Basketball Association (EBBA) to allow any new teams into the first division and this upset the Fine Ceramics Bolton team that had won the second division the year before. No invite had been extended to either them or Liverpool who had finished bottom of the first division. However it transpired that Bolton were eventually allowed to compete, a decision which then angered Liverpool but maintained a 13 team league. Liverpool then made the decision to merge with Warrington.Remarkably 11 of the 13 clubs made a new coaching appointment. The appointments were Randy Haefner (Sunderland), Rick Taylor (Hemel Hempstead), Jim Guymon (Kingston), Jim Kelly (Solent), Bill Sheridan (Brighton), Bob Mitchell (Birmingham), Joel Furnari (Leicester), Joe Whelton (Liverpool/Warrington), Tom Becker (Manchester), Jack Lehane (Bracknell), and Craig Lynch (Bolton).

League standings

First Division

One point deducted*

Second Division

Wimpey Homes Play Offs

Semi-finals

Final

Asda National Cup

Second round

Quarter finals

Semi-finals

Final

References

See also
Basketball in England
British Basketball League
English Basketball League
List of English National Basketball League seasons

National Basketball League (England) seasons
 
British